Sir John Roches (c.1333–1400), of Bromham, Wiltshire, was an English admiral, diplomat, magistrate and politician.

Political career
He was made Ambassador to the Kingdom of Aragon from 30 October 1377 to 4 May 1378, and again from 20 June 1378. He was then elected as Member (MP) of the Parliament of England for Wiltshire in 1381, and again in May 1382, October 1382, February 1383, April 1384, November 1390, 1394, January 1397 and 1399.

Naval career
He was first appointed Admiral to the West, a senior command of the English Navy, from 22 May 1381 to 23 November 1383. He was then given the post of Admiral of the North and Western Fleets from 21 May to 22 June 1389. He served both offices under Richard II.

Offices held
His offices included:
 Surveyor of the Forests of Chippenham, Melksham and Pewsham, all in Wiltshire, 5 December 1373.
 Ambassador to the Kingdom of Aragon, 30 October 1377 to 4 May 1378 and 20 June 1378.
 Joint Warden, of Savernake Forest, Wiltshire, 28 June 1381 to c.1382.
 Keeper of Marlborough Castle and Surveyor of Savernake Forest, 28 March 1382 until his death.
 Admiral of the West, 22 May 1382 to 23 November 1383. 
 Admiral of the North and West, 21 May to 22 June 1389.
 Justice of the Peace, Wiltshire 20 Dec. 1382-Mar. 1386, 28 June-Nov. 1396.
 Deputy Marshal of England, before March 1385, and January to March 1394.
 Captain of Brest, by 8 January 1386 to May 1388.
 Alnager of Wiltshire, 20 November 1388 to 8 March 1389.
 Sheriff of Wiltshire, 7 November 1390 to 21 October 1391.

Family
John Roche(s) married Willelma de la Mare (1365–1410), sole heiress of Robert de la Mare (1314–1382) of Steeple/Market Lavington, Wiltshire; by his wife Maud de Hastings (died 1405).  They had two daughters: first co-heir Elizabeth Roche (1385–1447) married Walter Beauchamp (d. 1430), son of William Beauchamp.  The other daughter, Joan, married to Nicholas Baynton, son of Nicholas Baynton by Joan Daundeley.  They had a son, John Baynton (born 1406) who was the second co-heir.

References

 Houbraken, Jacobus; Thoyras, Paul de Rapin; Vertue, George (1747). The History of England, A List of Admirals of England, 1228-1745. J. and P. Knapton.
 The History of Parliament: the House of Commons 1386-1421, ed. J.S. Roskell, L. Clark, C. Rawcliffe., 1993. Boydell and Brewer.

External links
 Inquisition Post Mortem 410 of John Roches, Knight
 Inquisition Post Mortem 937 of John de Roches, Knight
 Inquisition Post Mortem  883 of Willelma widow of John Roches.

1333 births
1400 deaths
14th-century English Navy personnel
English MPs 1381
People from Wiltshire
English admirals
High Sheriffs of Wiltshire
English MPs May 1382
English MPs October 1382
English MPs February 1383
English MPs April 1384
English MPs November 1390
English MPs 1394
English MPs January 1397
English MPs 1399